Florida's 12th congressional district is an electoral district for the U.S. Congress and was assigned along the Gulf coast of central Florida. The district includes Citrus County and Hernando County counties, as well as most of Pasco County, including the places of New Port Richey, Dade City, Spring Hill, and Homosassa Springs. 

From 2013 to 2023, it covered Pasco County and parts of north Pinellas County and Hillsborough County.

The district is currently represented by Republican Gus Bilirakis.

List of members representing the district

Election results from presidential races

Recent election results

2002

2004

2006

2008

2010

2012

2014

Bilirakis ran uncontested.

2016

2018

2020

2022

Notes

References

 Congressional Biographical Directory of the United States 1774–present

12